Borja García Freire (born 2 November 1990) is a Spanish professional footballer who plays as an attacking midfielder for Girona FC.

Club career

Rayo Vallecano
Born in Torremocha de Jarama, Community of Madrid, García joined local Rayo Vallecano at the age of 16, finishing his youth career there. On 20 June 2009, whilst still a junior, he made his debut as a professional, playing 11 minutes in a 2–2 home draw against Real Zaragoza in the Segunda División. In the 2009–10 season, additionally, he was a key figure for the reserves as they reached Segunda División B for the first time ever.

Córdoba
García stayed in the second division for 2011–12, signing with Córdoba CF. He scored 19 goals in 44 competitive matches during the campaign for the Andalusians, ranking fifth in the scoring charts.

Real Madrid B
In the summer of 2012, García joined another side in the second tier, Real Madrid Castilla. He played his 100th game at that level on 24 March 2013, against former club Córdoba.

García returned to the Estadio Nuevo Arcángel on 7 August 2014, after agreeing to a one-year loan. He made his La Liga debut late in the month, playing the whole second half in a 1–1 home draw to RC Celta de Vigo.

García scored his first goal in the Spanish top flight on 21 September 2014, but in a 1–3 home loss against Sevilla FC.

Girona and Huesca
On 26 August 2015, García agreed to a two-year contract at Girona FC after his link to Real Madrid expired. On 15 September 2020, after five years as an undisputed starter for the Catalans, García moved to SD Huesca, newly promoted to the first division, on a three-year deal. The following 31 August, after the latter's relegation, he left as a free agent.

García returned to Girona in August 2021, on a two-year contract.

Career statistics

References

External links

1990 births
Living people
Spanish footballers
Footballers from the Community of Madrid
Association football midfielders
La Liga players
Segunda División players
Tercera División players
Rayo Vallecano B players
Rayo Vallecano players
Córdoba CF players
Real Madrid Castilla footballers
Girona FC players
SD Huesca footballers
Spain youth international footballers